Liban Abdiaziz Abdulahi (born 2 November 1995) is a professional footballer who last played for Locomotive Tbilisi as a midfielder. Born in Holland, he represents the Somalia national team.

Club career
Abdulahi made his professional debut in the Eerste Divisie for SC Telstar on 10 August 2015 in a game against RKC Waalwijk.

In April 2021, he signed with 1. deild karla club Þór Akureyri. In 16 league games for Þór, he scored 1 goal.

International career
On 7 December 2019, Abdulahi made his debut for Somalia in a 0–0 draw against Djibouti in the 2019 CECAFA Cup.

Personal life
Abdulahi is cousins with fellow Somali international Ali Abdulkadir.

References

External links
 
 
 

1995 births
Living people
Association football midfielders
Footballers from Haarlem
People with acquired Somali citizenship
Somalian footballers
Dutch footballers
Dutch people of Somali descent
Somalia international footballers
Superettan players
Jönköpings Södra IF players
De Graafschap players
Eerste Divisie players
SC Telstar players
HFC Haarlem players
AFC Ajax players
A.V.V. Zeeburgia players
FC Groningen players
FC Volendam players
Koninklijke HFC players
Tweede Divisie players
Þór Akureyri players
FC Locomotive Tbilisi players
Dutch expatriate footballers
Somalian expatriate footballers
Expatriate footballers in Sweden
Expatriate footballers in Iceland
Expatriate footballers in Georgia (country)
Somalian expatriate sportspeople in Sweden
Somalian expatriate sportspeople in Iceland
Somalian expatriate sportspeople in Georgia (country)
Dutch expatriate sportspeople in Sweden
Dutch expatriate sportspeople in Iceland
Dutch expatriate sportspeople in Georgia (country)